In molecular biology, snoRNA HBII-239 belongs to the family of C/D snoRNAs. It is the human orthologue of the mouse MBII-239 described and is predicted to guide 2'O-ribose methylation of 5.8S rRNA on residue U14.

References

External links 
 

Small nuclear RNA